West Didsbury is a tram stop on the South Manchester Line (SML) of Greater Manchester's light-rail Metrolink system. It opened to passengers on 23 May 2013, in West Didsbury, South Manchester, England.

The Metrolink stop sits some 300m south east of the former heavy rail station of the Midland Railway, which opened 1 January 1880 as Withington; was renamed on 1 July 1884 to Withington and Albert Park; renamed again on 1 April 1915 to Withington and West Didsbury; and closed 3 July 1961. The route was earmarked for redevelopment with a light rail system during the 1980s, and was confirmed and funded as part of Metrolink's Phase 3b of expansion in 2006.

Service pattern 

History

Railway station
Withington and West Didsbury railway station opened in 1880 as "Withington" when the Midland Railway opened its new Manchester South District Line out of Manchester Central Station. The station was renamed "Withington & Albert Park" in 1884 and then "Withington & West Didsbury" in 1915.

The station closed in July 1961, although local services to other stations on the Manchester South District line continued to pass through until January 1967, and express trains continued to use this route until 1969, when the entre line was closed as part of the Beeching cuts. By the 2000s, the original cobbled station approach road and wall were still visible off Lapwing Lane, and the remains of the station platforms could still be seen at the bottom of the overgrown embankment.

Metrolink stop

In 1984, Greater Manchester Council and GMPTE announced the Project Light Rail scheme to develop a new light rail/tram system by re-opening use of disused railway lines in the region, including the route through West Didsbury. The first phase of the Manchester Metrolink system opened in 1992, but it was not until 2013 that the network was expanded to reach as far as East Didsbury, as part of Phase 3b of the Metrolink expansion project. Tram tracks were laid along the former trackbed and a new tram stop was constructed in the railway cutting on the opposite side of Palatine Road from the original railway station. The West Didsbury Metrolink stop opened on 23 May 2013.

See also
Sheffield and Midland Railway Companies' Committee
Midland Railway
Didsbury railway station

References

External links 

 Metrolink stop information
 West Didsbury area map

Withington
Didsbury
Tram stops in Manchester
Former Midland Railway stations
Railway stations in Great Britain opened in 1880
Railway stations in Great Britain closed in 1961
Railway stations in Great Britain opened in 2013
Manchester South District Line
Tram stops on the East Didsbury to Rochdale line